The Outer Islands or Coralline Seychelles (archipelago) is a collective term for those islands of the Seychelles that are not on the shallow Seychelles Bank (Seychelles Plateau) which defines the location of the granitic Inner Islands archipelago to the east. They are all of coral formation, and in the western Indian Ocean.

History
Until 2008, the islands were outside the administrative and electoral Districts of Seychelles.
In 2008 the shrimp farm closed on Coëtivy Island which caused a wave of job-seekers coming to Mahé.
The ministry of tourism was granted a free hand on these islands in order to settle down the unrest of the population, and declared it a district.

It formed the Islands Development Company (IDC) to control the islands, and prepared a program called 1 hotel 1 island. Each island in the group should be leased to a hotel, which will in turn built several residential homes and facilities on those islands. It required removal of the Protected Area Status from the islands. At first finding hotel chains was difficult, so Coëtivy received a prison, and thus creating jobs for the people who came back to their island.
Other islands received questionable facilities as well, e.g. Marie Louise Island a jail, Assumption Island an Army base, but on other islands had developments of resorts. The population increased again, for the first time in a century, from 500 in 2008 to 700 in 2016.
Conservation in the outer islands is managed by Island Conservation Society.
The Save Our Seas Foundation manages the nature preserve of D'Arros Island and its neighboring atolls.

Geography
The coral islands are flat with elevated coral reefs at different stages of formation. They are generally low-lying, and often form atolls around a central lagoon. The soils of the Corraline Seychelles are generally sandy and infertile, and hold little fresh water.
The Inner Islands or Granitic Seychelles, by contrast, are composed of granite on the Seychelles Bank plateau, and are ancient fragments of continental crust. They are generally more mountainous, humid, and populated.
The Outer Islands comprise  or 46% of the total land area of the Seychelles, but hold less than 1% of the population of the country.

Five groups
The Outer Islands are divided into five groups:
 Southern Coral Group — Île Platte and Coëtivy Island; land area 
 Amirante Islands — 3 atolls (including Desroches Island – , 5 single sand cays including D'Arros Island), and 3 uplifted sand cays; land area 
 Alphonse Group — Alphonse Atoll and St. François Atoll; land area 
 Aldabra Group — Aldabra Atoll, Assumption Island, Cosmoledo Atoll, and Astove Island; land area 
 Farquhar Group — Farquhar Atoll, Providence Atoll, and St. Pierre Island; land area

Demography
The lack of natural fresh water sources and infertile soils of these islands can sustain human life only with difficulty.  the population is 701 although this figure increases during the short summer vacation when Mahé people come to work in tourism and fishing on the islands. There are 12 inhabited islands (2016), The major are Coëtivy with 260 and Desroches with a 100.

Image gallery

Reference anonymous

External links

 Island guide 1
 Island guide 2
 National Bureau of Statistics
 Info on the island
 2010 Sailing directions
 Island Conservation Society website

 
Archipelagoes of Seychelles
Ecoregions of Seychelles
Districts of Seychelles